is a Japanese manga series written and illustrated by KAITO. It was serialized on the Shōnen Jump+ manga website from February 2017 to April 2020.

Publication
The series is written and illustrated by KAITO. It started serialization on the Shōnen Jump+ manga website on February 1, 2017, and ended on April 8, 2020. It has been published in eight tankōbon volumes.

At Anime Expo 2019, Viz Media announced they licensed the series in English. Manga Plus also published the series in English. It is also licensed in French by Kurokawa, in German by Carlsen Verlag, in Italian and Portuguese by Panini Comics, and in Spanish by Editorial Ivrea.

Volume list

Reception
The series was a finalist for the 2020 Los Angeles Times book prize in the graphic novels category. The Young Adult Library Services Association listed the series in the top ten in their 2021 list of the 126 best graphic novels for teenagers.

Rebecca Silverman from Anime News Network gave the first four volumes an A−, praising it for the art, characters, and story, while criticizing it because sometimes some characters can feel overly abusive or shy. Melina Dargis from The Fandom Post gave the series heavy praise for its story and characters, saying it was the best high-school slice-of-life manga of the year by far. Like Silverman and Dargis, Demezela from Anime UK News praised the story, artwork, and characters, ultimately rating the first volume a nine out of ten.

See also
 Cross Manage — Another manga series by the same author.

References

External links
 Official website at Viz Media
 

2017 manga
2017 webcomic debuts
Drama anime and manga
Japanese webcomics
LGBT in anime and manga
LGBT-related comics
Romance anime and manga
School life in anime and manga
Shōnen manga
Shueisha manga
Slice of life anime and manga
Viz Media manga
Webcomics in print